Michael Carroll is an American writer.

Biography
White published his debut short story collection, Little Reef, in 2014. The collection, which portrays characters that, according to the UW Press, are "people stunned by the shock of the now, who have forgotten their pasts and can’t envision a future".  The book was a shortlisted nominee for the Lambda Literary Award for Gay Fiction at the 27th Lambda Literary Awards and won the Sue Kaufman Prize for First Fiction from the American Academy of Arts and Letters.

His second book, Stella Maris: And Other Key West Stories, was published by Turtle Point Press in 2019.

His short stories also appeared in Ontario Review, Boulevard and The New Penguin Book of Gay Short Stories.

Originally from Jacksonville, Florida, he has been the partner of writer Edmund White since 1995. Carroll and White were legally married in 2013.

Works
Little Reef (2014)
Stella Maris: And Other Key West Stories (2019)

References

Writers from Florida
American gay writers
Living people
American male short story writers
Year of birth missing (living people)
21st-century American short story writers
21st-century American male writers
LGBT people from Florida